Gorakh Kalyan is a raga in Hindustani classical music. Its name is attributed to its origins in a regional type of song of Gorakhpur in Uttar Pradesh. Since it does not resemble Kalyan very much, some musicians prefer to just call it Gorakh.

References

Hindustani ragas